Shegang Town is an urban town in Liuyang, Hunan, People's Republic of China.  it had a population of 46,900 and an area of . Shegang borders Pingjiang County and Changsha County in the north and northeast, Gugang in the east and southeast, and Longfu and Shashi in the southwest.

Administrative division
The town is divided into 13 villages and three communities, the following areas: Zhenbei Community, Shegang Community, Xinguang Community, Zhouluo Village, Qingyuan Village, Liubei Village, Yongxing Village, Longhua Village, Huiyuan Village, Yuantian Village, Qingjiang Village, Hesheng Village, Danxia Village, Huaizhou Village, Shiniu Village, and Gaoshou Village.

Geography
The Liuyang River, a tributary of the Xiang River, it flows through the town.

The Guanshan Reservoir is the largest body of water in the town.

The Mount Longtoujian (a height of ) and Mount Shantoujian (a height of ) are mountains in the town.

Education
Shegang Meddle School.

Transportation
Pingru Expressway
National Highway G106

Attractions
Zhouluo Scenic Spot and Zhouluo Drifting are tourist attractions in the town.

References

External links

Divisions of Liuyang
Liuyang